Why Is the Crow Black-Coated is the first Chinese animation short film in color produced at the Shanghai Animation Film Studio by Wan Laiming and Wan Guchan.

Plot
The story is about a very arrogant bird that enjoys life.  He sang and danced in the forest in China, showing off his beautiful tail to everyone. Autumn would come and the other animals in the forest are busy preparing food for the winter.  The bird continues to live life leisurely.

The winter would come instantly with a heavy snow storm.  The bird is now homeless in the cold without preparation.  To warm up, he found a random wild fire in the forest.  The bird accidentally burned his tail and also lost his singing voice.  From there on, the bird is no longer beautiful and is known as the black crow.

Creators

Background
Two of the Wan brothers took part in the production.  The film was created right before Shanghai Animation Film Studio became a government sponsored division which would later be affected by the Cultural Revolution under Mao Zedong.

Awards
It is the first Chinese animation to be recognized internationally in 1956 at the Venice Film Festival.  In 1957 it was also awarded by China's Ministry of Culture.

See also
 Chinese animation
 History of animation
 History of Chinese animation

References
 CCTV cartoon history

External links
 Why is the Crow Black-Coated at China Movie Database

1956 animated films
1956 films
Chinese animated films
Chinese short films
Chinese animated short films
1956 short films